The Sexmuseum or the Temple of Venus (Dutch: Venustempel) is a sex museum located in Amsterdam, Netherlands. The museum opened in 1985. It had 675,000 visitors in 2015, making it one of the most visited museums in the Netherlands.

The museum features an extensive collection of pictures, recordings, photos, paintings and artifacts which allow visitors to explore the evolution of human sexuality throughout the ages. Exhibits present the history of sex and how it has evolved over the centuries. From Cleopatra's regiment of men, to the Romans’ insatiable appetite for sex, to the repressive Middle Ages, visitors are presented with how sex was viewed throughout historical civilizations.

See also
List of sex museums

References 

Sexmuseum Amsterdam

External links 
 Sexmuseum Amsterdam, official website
 

1985 establishments in the Netherlands
Museums established in 1985
Museums in Amsterdam
Sex museums
20th-century architecture in the Netherlands